Arco de Santa María in Burgos, Spain, is to one of the twelve medieval gates the city had during the middle ages. It was rebuilt by Charles V, Holy Roman Emperor during the 16th century after the local rulers of the city supported him during the Revolt of the Comuneros. On the facade of the arch appear people of importance to the city of Burgos and Castile, such as Diego Rodríguez Porcelos, the founder of the city; Jueces de Castilla; Laín Calvo and Nuño Rasura; El Cid; Fernán González; and Charles V himself.

The interior of the building is open to the public and houses temporary art displays, a large mural by Burgos artist José Vela Zanetti and an exhibition of antique pharmaceutical equipment.

It was added to the list of National Monuments in 1943.

References

Buildings and structures in Burgos
City gates in Spain